Hardy L. Brian (1865 - 1949) was a newspaper publisher and populist political party leader in Louisiana. He published the Winnfield Comrade in Winnfield, Louisiana. He also established the Louisiana Populist newspaper in 1894 in  Natchitoches. He closed it in March 9, 1899, returned to Winn Parish, and became a civic and church leader. He purchased the Winnfield Times in 1916 and edited it for two years. He was a leader in the Populist Party in Louisiana.

References

19th-century American newspaper founders
19th-century American newspaper editors

1865 births
1949 deaths